Robert Kimpton (5 January 1914 – 6 February 2007) was an Australian cricketer. He played one first-class match for Western Australia in 1935/36. He was the last surviving player from the Western Australia side that played the Marylebone Cricket Club (MCC) side during their tour to Australia in October 1935.

See also
 List of Western Australia first-class cricketers

References

External links
 

1914 births
2007 deaths
Australian cricketers
Western Australia cricketers
People from Essendon, Victoria
Cricketers from Melbourne